Baghāre baingan is a curry from the Hyderabadi cuisine made with eggplant (brinjal) Hyderabad. It is also used as a side dish with the Hyderabadi biryani.

Etymology 
The word baghār refers to tempering, and the word baingan refers to eggplant.

History

Baghaare baingan was introduced during the Mughal Empire from Tashkent and later became popular in Hyderabad. The Mughlai cuisine influenced cuisine in South Asia significantly between 16th and 19th century.

See also
 Baghaar
 Indian cuisine

References

Eggplant dishes
Hyderabadi cuisine
Indian curries
Muhajir cuisine